The canton of Mézidon Vallée d'Auge (before 2021: Mézidon-Canon) is a canton of France, located in the Calvados department, in the Normandy region.

Geography 
This canton is organized around Mézidon-Canon. Its altitude varies from 4 m (Méry-Corbon) to 170 m (Castillon-en-Auge) with an average altitude of 42 m.

Communes 
Since the French canton reorganisation which came into effect in March 2015, the communes of the canton of Mézidon-Canon are:

Auvillars
Beaufour-Druval
Belle Vie en Auge
Beuvron-en-Auge
La Boissière
Bonnebosq
Cambremer
Castillon-en-Auge
Condé-sur-Ifs
Drubec
Formentin
Le Fournet
Gerrots
Hotot-en-Auge
La Houblonnière
Léaupartie
Lessard-et-le-Chêne
Manerbe
Méry-Bissières-en-Auge
Le Mesnil-Eudes
Le Mesnil-Simon
Mézidon Vallée d'Auge
Les Monceaux
Montreuil-en-Auge
Notre-Dame-d'Estrées-Corbon
Notre-Dame-de-Livaye
Le Pré-d'Auge
Prêtreville
Repentigny
La Roque-Baignard
Rumesnil
Saint-Désir
Saint-Germain-de-Livet
Saint-Jean-de-Livet
Saint-Martin-de-Mailloc
Saint-Ouen-le-Pin
Saint-Pierre-des-Ifs
Valsemé
Victot-Pontfol

Demography

See also 
 Cantons of the Calvados department

References 

Mezidon Vallee d'Auge